James Alexander Smith (August 22, 1911 – March 29, 1993) was a teacher and politician. He was born in Bawlf, Alberta, Canada.
 
Smith first ran for the House of Commons of Canada in a by-election held in the electoral district of Battle River—Camrose. He defeated former Member of Parliament William Irvine and Liberal candidate Mac Smith by less than 400 votes.  He ran for re-election in the 1957 general election and won in a landslide.  He was defeated in the 1958 election by Progressive Conservative candidate Clifford Smallwood whom Smith had defeated the year before.  Smith faced Smallwood again in the 1962 general election and was again defeated.

Smith ran in the electoral district of Peace River in the 1963 election and was defeated by incumbent Ged Baldwin. He ran against Baldwin again in the 1965 election and was defeated again.

He married Margaret Bowen on July 2, 1936 at Wainwright, Alberta. He died in Edmonton in 1993.

References

External links
 

1911 births
1993 deaths
Social Credit Party of Canada MPs
Members of the House of Commons of Canada from Alberta
People from Bawlf, Alberta